Rajasthan Samgrah  Kalyan  Sansthan (RSKS) is a grassroots Indian non profit organization (NGO) based in Ajmer District of Rajasthan state. RSKS India follows the UN Global Compact Principle and is certified by Guidestar India.

RSKS India was granted special consultative status in 2015 by the Economic and Social Council (ECOSOC) of the United Nations.

History
Rajasthan Samgrah Kalyan Sansthan was founded on 2 December 1992 by youths interested in the Social Work. RSKS India has been working to assist this marginalized community since 1992.

The RSKS India organization is situated in Aravali in the state of Rajasthan.

Areas of focus

RSKS India focusses on campaigning and advocacy for:

Women empowerment
Sustainable livelihood
Education
Environment and sanitation
Health
Agriculture and livestock
Disaster recovery and management
Child rights and welfare

Awards and certifications

Sakhi award for women empowerment honoured by CM Vasundhara Raje Rajasthan Gov. (dainik bhaskar & Hindustan zink)
National Excellence Award honoured by Alma Foundation.
Transparency non profit verified by the Guidestar India.
RSKS India Has Been Granted Special Consultative Status (2015) By The Economic and Social Council (ECOSOC) of The United Nation.
 The White Ribbon Alliance for Safe Motherhood, India Partner Member

References

External links

Organisations based in Rajasthan
Organizations established in 1992
Charities based in India
1992 establishments in Rajasthan